Mountain View is a city in Santa Clara County, California, United States. Named for its views of the Santa Cruz Mountains, it has a population of 82,376.

Mountain View was integral to the early history and growth of Silicon Valley, and is the location of many high technology companies. In 1956, William Shockley established Shockley Semiconductor Laboratory in Mountain View, the first company to develop silicon semiconductor devices in Silicon Valley. Today, Mountain View houses the headquarters of many of the world's largest technology companies, including Google and Alphabet Inc., Unicode Consortium, Intuit, NASA Ames research center, and major headquarter offices for Microsoft, Symantec, 23andMe, LinkedIn, Samsung, and Synopsys.

History

The Mexican land grant of Rancho Pastoria de las Borregas was given in 1842 by Alta California Governor Juan Alvarado to Francisco Estrada. This grant was later passed on to Mariano Castro, who sold half of the land to Martin Murphy Jr. 
Eventually, the former land grant was developed as the cities of Mountain View and Sunnyvale.

The southwest shore of San Francisco Bay was settled by European-Americans in 1852 as a stagecoach station. This was after the United States acquired California. By the early 1900s, it was a shipping point for fruit and grain, as well as a center of religious book publishing.    
  
The early pioneers were commonly buried at the old cemetery between Mercy & Church, off Castro Street. This is now the site of the present city library and park, known as Pioneer Park.

Residents 
Reverend Henry Merrill Henderson, born in Maryland, arrived here at age 35 with his family in 1852; he was meeting relatives: the Ricketts and others who had migrated from Missouri and Kentucky. He was the first Baptist minister in town. He soon rode a circuit for preaching, going by horseback to Half-Moon Bay and McCarthysville for services.

Later that year, Seligman Weilheimer and his brother Samuel immigrated from Dossenheim, Baden, Germany. They settled on the next plot, and in 1856 built the first big general merchandise store in the settlement.

William Bubb bought  to farm in October 1851; he became a leader in town and died there in 1864. His heirs' descendants prospered, marrying into other pioneer families.

Advent of local aerospace and electronics industries 
The U.S. Navy's adjacent  Moffett Field Complex was constructed beginning after 1931; its development attracted many workers and it brought many economic opportunities. After World War II, the population grew significantly with the development of regional aerospace and electronics industries. Between 1950 and 1960, the population grew from 6,563 to 30,889, an increase of 370.7%.

Between 1929 and 1994, Moffett Field Naval Air Station operated in Mountain View. In 1940, the city was the base of the National Advisory Committee for Aeronautics (now the NASA Ames Research Center), which had a strong influence on the development of aerospace and electronics industries.

Current economic climate 
Today, high technology is the foundation of the local economy. Few remnants are visible of the city's agricultural past.

In 1990, Kevin Duggan began his position as city manager. He built a relationship with Google, Inc., and issued a long-term lease to it and other technology companies. As of 2014, those leases generate over $5 million per year in city revenue. The Castro Street downtown area also benefited from a special tax district.

In 2016, the city's voters approved a rent control ordinance.

Geography
The city borders Palo Alto and the San Francisco Bay to the north, Los Altos to the south, and Moffett Federal Airfield and Sunnyvale to the east.

Mountain View is located in the south-eastern and south western section of the San Francisco Peninsula.,  at the north end of State Route 85, where it meets U.S. Route 101. State Route 82 follows the route of the historic El Camino Real through Mountain View. The city is bounded to the northwest by Palo Alto, to the north by the Bay, to the south and southwest by Los Altos, and to the east by Sunnyvale and Moffett Federal Airfield.

To the west lie the Santa Cruz Mountains. The city was named for these, which separate it from the Pacific Ocean. The two ranges demarcate the Santa Clara Valley.

Neighborhoods 
Most of Mountain View consists of residential neighborhoods. Business parks are located mostly in the North Shoreline neighborhood, north of Highway 101 and east of Highway 85.

The Blossom Valley neighborhood comprises five smaller neighborhoods: Springer Meadows, Varsity Park, Blossom Valley Estates, Springer Trees, and Gest Ranch/. The neighborhood's ranch-style housing was built in the 1950s and 1960s on orchard land.

The Cuernavaca neighborhood is located off Crestview Drive near the Sunnyvale border. This neighborhood used to be the location of a cherry orchard, and later a nine-hole golf course and swim club before it was turned into housing, which was completed in 1989. Most of the housing in Cuernavaca is Spanish-style, with red tiled roofs.

The Monta Loma neighborhood is located between the bounds of San Antonio Road, Middlefield Road, Rengstorff Avenue and Central Expressway. Currently Monta Loma houses a collection of California-style mid-century modern houses by Joseph Eichler, John Calder Mackay, and Mardell Building Company.

Climate 
Mountain View has a warm-summer Mediterranean climate (Köppen climate classification Csb: dry-summer subtropical). Summers are warm and dry, while winters are cool and wet. However, both summers and winters are somewhat moderated due to its relative proximity to the Pacific, although it has a lesser maritime influence than San Francisco further north on the peninsula.

Economy

Mountain View is one of the major cities that make up Silicon Valley, and has many notable Silicon Valley companies either headquartered there or with a large presence. As of 2018, major tech companies such as Google and Mozilla were headquartered in Mountain View. In 2018, the comparison site CareerBliss ranked the city number 1 in the United States on its list of Happiest Cities to Work for 2018.

After voting to increase the minimum wage incrementally in 2015, in December 2017, the Mountain View City Council implemented a mandatory $15 minimum wage, to apply to employees who work two or more hours a week. At the start of 2018, Mountain View raised its minimum wage to $15. Starting on January 1, 2019, the minimum wage was to be "adjusted annually based on the San Francisco-Oakland-San Jose regional Consumer Price Index."  A proposal to slow down the rate of the wage increases by a year was defeated in a City Council meeting on December 4, 2018. Subsequently, on December 30, 2018, it was announced that Mountain View's minimum wage would rise to $15.65 on January 1, 2019, with the increase delayed by one year for companies with 25 or fewer employees. As of January 2020, the minimum wage in Mountain View is $16.05 per hour.

Top employers
According to the city's 2022 Annual Comprehensive Financial Report, the main employers in the city are:

Economic past
Due to its history as a center for semiconductor manufacturing, Mountain View has seven sites on the Environmental Protection Agency's Final National Priorities List (NPL), a list of hazardous waste sites in the United States eligible for long-term remedial action financed under the federal Superfund program. The sites were formerly used by companies including Fairchild Semiconductor, Intel, Raytheon, CTS Printex Inc., Spectra-Physics, Jasco Chemical, GTE and Teledyne. These seven sites make up a portion of the 22 NPL sites in Santa Clara County, which are included in the total of 94 sites in California.

Demographics

2010–2018
The 2010 United States Census reported that Mountain View had a population of 74,066. The census reported that 73,801 people (99.6% of the population) lived in households, 145 (0.2%) lived in non-institutionalized group quarters, and 120 (0.2%) were institutionalized. There were 31,957 households, out of which 8,731 (27.3%) had children under the age of 18 living in them, 13,806 (43.2%) were opposite-sex married couples living together, 2,456 (7.7%) had a female householder with no husband present, 1,253 (3.9%) had a male householder with no wife present. There were 1,928 (6.0%) unmarried opposite-sex partnerships, and 280 (0.9%) same-sex married couples or partnerships. 10,961 households (34.3%) were made up of individuals, and 2,471 (7.7%) had someone living alone who was 65 years of age or older. The average household size was 2.31. There were 17,515 families (54.8% of all households); the average family size was 3.01. The population was spread out, with 14,594 people (19.7%) under the age of 18, 5,401 people (7.3%) aged 18 to 24, 28,577 people (38.6%) aged 25 to 44, 17,647 people (23.8%) aged 45 to 64, and 7,846 people (10.6%) who were 65 years of age or older. The median age was 35.9 years. For every 100 females, there were 103.6 males. For every 100 females age 18 and over, there were 103.5 males. The homeowner vacancy rate was 1.3%; the rental vacancy rate was 4.4%. 32,002 people (43.2% of the population) lived in owner-occupied housing units, and 41,799 people (56.4%) lived in rental housing units.

As of 2013, according to the US Bureau of Labor Statistics, Mountain View had an unemployment rate of 5%. It had a female population of 49.1 percent and a male population of 50.9 percent. Persons under five were 7.1 percent, persons under 18 were 19.7 percent, and persons age 65 and older were 10.6 percent. In 2016, 8.7 percent of people in Mountain View were living below the poverty line. Of the citizens over the age of sixteen, 64.3 percent were employed in the labor force, while 26.2 percent were not.

According to the Santa Clara County Homeless Census and Survey, the number of homeless individuals in Mountain View increased 51% from 2015 to 2017, with 276 homeless individuals in 2015, and 416 in 2017. In August 2017, the Mercury News reported that Mountain View had seen RVs and recreational vehicles become the choice of residence for many working poor in the city. The city's communications coordinator called it a "new" situation, noting that many of the residents living in RVs were working up to three jobs, and that affordable housing was hard to come by in the city. In December 2017, Google received approval to build nearly 10,000 new units of housing near its future campus in the city.

2000
As of the census of 2000, there were 70,708 people, 31,242 households, and 15,902 families residing in the city. The population density was 2,263.7/km2 (5,861.4/mi2). There were 32,432 housing units at an average density of 1,038.3/km2 (2,688.5/mi2). The racial makeup of the city was 63.77% White, 20.67% Asian, 18.26% Hispanic or Latino (of any race), 2.53% African American, 0.39% Native American, 0.26% Pacific Islander, 8.32% from other races, and 4.07% from two or more races.

There were 31,242 households, out of which 23.3% had children under the age of 18 living with them, 40.0% were married couples living together, 7.3% had a female householder with no husband present, and 49.1% were non-families. 35.6% of all households were made up of individuals, and 7.0% had someone living alone who was 65 years of age or older. The average household size was 2.25 and the average family size was 2.97.

In the city, the population was spread out, with 18.0% under the age of 18, 8.3% from 18 to 24, 43.4% from 25 to 44, 19.8% from 45 to 64, and 10.5% who were 65 years of age or older. The median age was 35 years. For every 100 females, there were 106.8 males. For every 100 females age 18 and over, there were 106.9 males.

According to a 2007 estimate the median income for a household in the city was $82,648, and the median income for a family was $105,079. Males had a median income of $64,585 versus $44,358 for females. The per capita income for the city was $39,693. About 3.6% of families and 6.8% of the population were below the poverty line, including 7.2% of those under age 18 and 5.9% of those age 65 or over.

Government

Mountain View has a council-manager government system. An executive city manager is in charge of several departments, while the city council, supported by several boards, commissions, and committees, is the legislature responsible for the ordinances of the city code. The executive in turn enforces the code and promulgates administrative regulations to execute it. The city clerk and attorney perform supporting roles. The Community Development Department is the agency responsible for planning and zoning.

State and federal representatives 

City council 
Mountain View is represented by a 7-member council elected at-large. The mayor is a council member appointed by their peers each year. The City Council maintains a number of Council Advisory Bodies, which provide input on a range of city matters pertaining to development, land use and historical preservation.

Public safety 
The Mountain View Fire Department maintains five stations, and is responsible for fire protection and emergency medical services.

The Mountain View Police Department maintains patrol, traffic enforcement, detective, K9 and SWAT services for the city, and participates in several task forces, including the Regional Allied Computer Crime Task Force (REACT) and the Regional Auto Theft Task Force (RAATF).

Education
Mountain View is served by a mix of public and private schools.

Public
The public elementary (Bubb, Castro, Imai, Landels, Mistral, Monta Loma, Stevenson, Theuerkauf, and Vargas) and middle schools (Crittenden and Graham) are governed by the Mountain View-Whisman School District. Springer Elementary, although located within the borders of Mountain View, is governed by the Los Altos School District. The public high schools are governed by the Mountain View-Los Altos Union High School District and consist of Alta Vista High School, Mountain View High School, and Los Altos High School. Mountain View High and Los Altos High each contain approximately 50% Los Altos residents and 50% Mountain View residents. Some Mountain View residents attend Almond Elementary and Egan Junior High in the Los Altos School District.

Mountain View taxed a large portion of its most valuable commercial and industrial properties in the Shoreline Regional Park Community at very low relative levels, and until the creation of a joint-powers agreement (JPA) in 2006, none of those property taxes reached the local schools. After the creation of the JPA, the Shoreline Regional Park Community shared less than $1 million per year with the elementary and high school districts.

In 2008, a citizen-supported parcel tax, largely aimed at reducing class sizes, was renewed in an overwhelmingly positive vote. The current ratio of students to full-time-equivalent teachers in the Mountain View public elementary schools is 20.4 : 1.

Private

Notable private schools in Mountain View include: Khan Lab School, a laboratory school associated with Khan Academy; Saint Francis High School, a Roman Catholic secondary school; German International School of Silicon Valley (GISSV), a PK-12 German-English bilingual international school; and Yew Chung International School of Silicon Valley, a PK-8 Chinese-English bilingual international school.

Library

Mountain View has one central public library, the Mountain View Public Library, which has video, music, books, and access to the Internet. The library provides outreach services through the bookmobile and S.O.S. volunteer program to those in Mountain View who are unable to come to the main branch. The building was built in 1997. The second floor of the library has a special collection in a room devoted to the history of Mountain View, which features a portrait of Crisanto Castro, for whom the major downtown thoroughfare is named. Displayed outside the library is a piece of the Berlin Wall, installed in 2013.

Infrastructure

Transportation

The Downtown Mountain View Station is the transit center for the city, connecting the public commuter rail, light rail, bus, and private shuttle systems. Mountain View is served by the Caltrain commuter rail system, which runs from San Francisco to Gilroy. The two Caltrain stations in the city are Downtown Mountain View Station and San Antonio Station. The city is also served by the Santa Clara Valley Transportation Authority (VTA), which operates various bus lines and the light rail system. There are a total of four stations in the city on the Orange Line VTA light rail line, with Downtown Mountain View Station serving as the northern terminus, while the other three stations are Whisman, Middlefield, and Bayshore/NASA. MVgo is a free shuttle service that runs three routes throughout Mountain View beginning and ending at Downtown Mountain View Station during morning and evening commute hours. Many large local employers (including Google, Microsoft, Apple Inc., and NASA Ames Research Center) operate employee shuttles that stop at the Downtown Mountain View Station. There is also a free community shuttle bus that serves 50 stops within Mountain View.

The three nearest major airports are San Jose International Airport (SJC), San Francisco International Airport (SFO), and Oakland International Airport (OAK), respectively. Moffett Federal Airfield is located just north of Mountain View, but it is restricted to government, military, and private use. The nearest general aviation airport is the Palo Alto Airport of Santa Clara County.

Utilities
Power in the city is operated by Pacific Gas and Electric Company.

On August 16, 2006, after over a year of test deployments, Google announced that its implementation of free IEEE 802.11g wireless service for all of the city was fully operational.

On February 19, 2014, the City of Mountain View and Google announced a new connectivity plan for residents, to replace the existing system. Service was to be available along the downtown corridor of Mountain View, primarily on Castro Street. Other areas to be covered included Rengstorff Park, the Mountain View Public Library, Senior, Community, and Teen Centers.

Points of interest

Downtown
Mountain View has a pedestrian-friendly downtown centered on Castro Street. The downtown area consists of the seven blocks of Castro Street from the Downtown Mountain View Station transit center in the north to the intersection with El Camino Real in the south. The transit center links the Caltrain commuter rail and Santa Clara Valley Transportation Authority (VTA) light rail and bus systems.

Four blocks with a concentration of restaurants, cafes, and shops extend south from the downtown station. The Michelin Guide-starred restaurant Chez TJ is located a block from Castro Street on Villa Street. Tied House, located next door, was one of the first brewpubs in the Bay Area, and was a popular stop in downtown until it closed in 2019.

The core of downtown is the plaza shared by City Hall, the Mountain View Center for the Performing Arts (MVCPA) and the Mountain View Public Library. The plaza is used for many community gatherings and events, and features a collection of public art. Peninsula Youth Theatre and TheatreWorks are among the home companies of the MVCPA. The City Hall and MVCPA complex, designed by William Turnbull of San Francisco, opened in 1991. Behind those buildings is Pioneer Park, formerly the site of Mountain View's first cemetery.

The Mountain View Police Department is located two blocks away from Castro Street on Villa Street.

Since 1971, the city has held the annual Mountain View Art & Wine Festival on Castro Street by closing down the street to traffic for two days. There is a farmers' market in the Caltrain parking lot every Sunday morning. Every summer, once a month, the city celebrates Thursday Night Live by closing off Castro street to cars and providing live music events and car shows on Castro Street.

The entire length of El Camino in Mountain View is a low-density commercial area.

Parks

The largest park in the city is Shoreline Park, which was built on a landfill and runs along the Bay north of U.S. Route 101. It includes Shoreline Amphitheatre, Shoreline Golf Course, as well as Rengstorff House, which is listed in the National Register of Historic Places. On the north side, facing the Bay, the park includes tidal ponds and mudflats, accessible via pedestrian and bicycle paths. The San Francisco Bay Trail runs along Shoreline Park.

Stevens Creek runs through Mountain View from the south and empties into the Bay in Shoreline Park. A paved pedestrian and bicycle path, the Stevens Creek Trail, runs alongside the creek for nearly its entire distance in Mountain View. Stevens Creek is home to coyotes, gray foxes, black-tailed deer, butterflies, dragonflies, and 150 species of birds, as well as shorebirds that feed in the mudflat. The shorebirds can be seen at low tide.

Other parks include:

 Eagle Park, which holds a public swimming pool, dog-friendly lawn, and World War II memorial
 Cuesta Park, a sprawling park with tennis courts, barbecue areas, and playgrounds, near El Camino Hospital and the YMCA
 Rengstorff Park, home to a public swimming pool, community center, skate park, fenced dog park, and multiple playgrounds and picnic areas
 Charleston Park, a five-acre park located near the Googleplex. The park was designed by SWA Group who received an ASLA Centennial Medallion in 1999 for their work.

Media
The Mountain View Voice is a local newspaper, which began publishing in 1993.

Buildings

The Computer History Museum has a collection of computing artifacts.

The Shoreline Amphitheater is a large outdoor venue for large concerts and shows.

Moffett Field is a joint civil-military federal airfield located between northern Mountain View and northern Sunnyvale, California. It is home to the Air National Guard. Its hangars for blimps and rigid airships (now mostly vacant) make unique landmarks for motorists on Highway 101.

NASA Ames Research Center is a research facility adjacent to Moffett, and also houses a gift-shop NASA visitor center.

The Mountain View Adobe, a small events center on Moffett Boulevard, is listed in the National Register of Historic Places.

Seminary
St. Joseph Parish was founded in 1905, and survived the 1906 San Francisco earthquake, only to burn down in 1928. St. Joseph's Seminary operated here between 1924 and 1991. The current St. Joseph church building was built in 1929.

Sister cities
The Mountain View Sister City Affiliation was incorporated in 1974 as an independent non-profit governed by a board of directors. Mountain View is affiliated with the cities of

 Iwata, Shizuoka, Japan
 Hasselt, Belgium

The rock garden in Pioneer Park was a gift from the sister city of Iwata to celebrate the completion of Mountain View's City Hall building.

See also

 Timeline of Mountain View, California
 St. Joseph's Seminary (Mountain View, California)

Notable people

 Jabri Abdur-Rahim, college basketball player for the Georgia Bulldogs
 Tully Banta-Cain, two-time Super Bowl champion
 Carroll Clark, seven-time Academy Award for Best Art Direction nominee
 Laura Chavez, blues, soul, and rhythm and blues guitarist, songwriter and record producer
 Assaf Cohen, supporting actor, Heroes and Entourage
 Josh Cohen, professional soccer player
 Brandon Crawford, professional baseball player in MLB, plays for the San Francisco Giants
 Paula Creamer, professional golfer and formerly Women's World Golf Rankings number two player
 Hugh Fate, dentist and Alaska state representative
 Dave Finocchio, co-founder of Bleacher Report
 Doris Gates, author and librarian
 Dan Green, powerlifter, world record holder in 220 and 242 lbs weight classes
 Steve Jobs, technology entrepreneur, co-founder and CEO of Apple, lived in Mountain View during his childhood
 Edward Michael Keating (1925–2003), American publisher, journalist, lawyer; founder of Ramparts, member of the New Left movement.
 Salman Khan, Khan Academy online educator, resides in Mountain View
 Mark Keil, five-time ATP tennis doubles champion
 Jan Koum, CEO and co-founder of WhatsApp, grew up in Mountain View
 Kurt Kuenne, filmmaker and composer best known for the documentary Dear Zachary: A Letter to a Son About His Father
 Mark Leonard, former left fielder for the San Francisco Giants and Baltimore Orioles
 Sally J. Lieber, former mayor of Mountain View and politician
 Kenny Roberts Jr., 2000 500cc Road Racing World Champion
 Bianca Sierra, player for Mexico women's national football team.
 Jose Antonio Vargas, journalist, filmmaker, immigration rights activist, and namesake of new Mountain View elementary school 
 Andy Weir, wrote The Martian book and eventual film, while living in Mountain View

References

Bibliography

External links

 

 
1902 establishments in California
Butterfield Overland Mail in California
Cities in Santa Clara County, California
Cities in the San Francisco Bay Area
Incorporated cities and towns in California
Populated places established in 1902
Silicon Valley
Populated coastal places in California